Álvaro Mejía may refer to:
 Álvaro Mejía Pérez (born 1982), Spanish football player
 Álvaro Mejía (cyclist) (born 1967), Colombian cyclist
 Álvaro Mejía (athlete) (1940–2021), Colombian long-distance runner